Glenea grossepunctata is a species of beetle in the family Cerambycidae. It was described by Stephan von Breuning in 1958. It is known from Moluccas.

Subspecies
 Glenea grossepunctata grossepunctata Breuning, 1958
 Glenea grossepunctata soembanensis Breuning, 1958

References

grossepunctata
Beetles described in 1958